Giving and Taking  is the eighth studio album by Australian group the Seekers. The album was released in 1976 and is the second studio album to feature the vocals of Louisa Wisseling. The album peaked at number 5 in New Zealand.

The album produced the singles, "Where in the World?" (April 1976) and "Giving and Taking" (June 1976).

Track listing
All tracks composed by Bruce Woodley; except where indicated
Side A
 "Friends" - 3:38	
 "The Rose and the Briar" (Woodley, John Farrar) - 3:53
 "Giving and Taking" - 3:07
 "A Part of You" - 3:32
 "Country Lanes" (Barry Gibb, Robin Gibb) - 3:03

Side B
 "Country Rose" - 3:27
 "Holding On" (Woodley, Farrar) - 2:53
 "If I Could Write a Fairy Tale" (Keith Potger, James Mason) - 3:23
 "A Finer Country Day" - 3:40
 "Standing on Shaky Ground" (Woodley, Farrar) - 3:58
 "Where in the World"(Woodley, Farrar) - 3:43

Weekly charts

References

External links

The Seekers albums
Polydor Records albums
1976 albums
Albums produced by John Farrar